Augustas Pečiukevičius (born 2 December 1991) is a professional Lithuanian basketball player. He plays for point guard and shooting guard positions for Leyma Coruña of the LEB Oro.

On 19 August 2021 Pečiukevičius re-signed with Leyma Coruña.

International career 
Pečiukevičius represented the Lithuanian youth squads twice. He won bronze medal with the U-16 National Team in 2007 FIBA Europe Under-16 Championship and  silver medal with the U-18 National Team in 2008 FIBA Europe Under-18 Championship.

References 

1991 births
Living people
Basketball players from Vilnius
Brussels Basketball players
CB Miraflores players
KK Pärnu players
Korvpalli Meistriliiga players
Lithuanian expatriate basketball people in Estonia
Lithuanian men's basketball players
Medalists at the 2011 Summer Universiade
Point guards
Shooting guards
University of Tartu basketball team players
Universiade bronze medalists for Lithuania
Universiade medalists in basketball